Madlen Namro (born August 29, 1973) is a Polish science-fiction author who writes in Polish. She received an award for her first science-fiction book which is translated in English, the second one is also a bestseller in Poland. As journalist, she also writes articles published in various magazines and websites all over the world.

Early career
Madlen was 9 years old when she wrote her first book. She described her adventures with her dog who was a talking dog.

Singer, writer, composer
Madlen was also a songwriter of the punk band "De Vanegat", 
in which she sang and composed the music.

Later she worked as actress in a music-theater in Łódź. 
This short artistic career, allowed her to understand that what she desires to do is writing books.

International career
On the Polish market Madlen made a debut in 2007 with a futurist book titled Komandosi, released by Anagram Publishing House. This book appeared also in 2011 on the US and UK markets, giving her the international writer status.
In the meantime, she wrote several stories for children, published in London, titled Rainbow Stories. 
Madlen gave all proceeds from this book to the Stickler Syndrome Foundation in the UK.
In 2012, the first time she wrote Non-fiction stories titled The Black Pearl.
This booklet was published in French, in German, Italian and in English but not in Polish.
Madlen also writes screenplays and books for young people.

Journalist
Madlen also works as a journalist for magazines like Mindscape in the UK and websites like Marshall Masters one in the US and also Mediterranea Online in Italy.

Since January 2011, she is a full member of the prestigious Women's Writers and Journalists Society in London.

Publications

The first part of Madlen's trilogy, Komandosi, initially published in 2007 in Polish by Anagram Publishing, was also published in 2011 in English by Raider Publishing International as Commandos, the trilogy. The title is also published in English as E-book.
The second part of her trilogy, Tropiciele, was published in 2010 in Polish by Anagram Publishing.
Ancient Nuclear Wars and Our Future
I figli tra i fumi dell'alcol
New Swabia and Mysteries of the Chronos Project
and
The Black Pearl (Madlen Namro)

Awards

Madlen Namro was awarded in 2008 by her editor, Anagram Publishing, for her trilogy: Komandosi.

References

External links
Official English website: madlennamro.com
Official Polish website: madlennamro.pl
Official Blog: 

Polish women writers
Polish science fiction writers
Living people
1973 births
Writers from Łódź